Igors Samusonoks (born November 6, 1972 in the Soviet Union) is a former competitor in freestyle wrestling who represented Latvia at the 2000 Summer Olympics. He finished in 12th place at 85 kg.

At the junior level, Igors was a world champion in 1990. At the senior level, he represented Latvia at the World Wrestling Championships  7 times from 1991-2003. His highest placing was 10th in 1991. Another major accomplishment was winning a silver medal at the 1999 European Championships.

References

External links
 
 
 

Wrestlers at the 2000 Summer Olympics
Latvian male sport wrestlers
1972 births
Living people
Olympic wrestlers of Latvia
European Wrestling Championships medalists